Charles van Rysselberghe (25 July 1850 – 30 April 1920) was a Belgian architect.

Biography
Carolus Julianus van Rysselberghe was born in Meerle, Hoogstraten, on 25 July 1850. He was trained at the Academy of Ghent, studying there between 1863 and 1875. After his education at the academy, he was honored with the Prize of the City of Ghent.

He was municipal architect of the city of Ostend for two years. Among his works in this city is the Vishal. Then, in 1879, he became city architect of the city of Ghent, succeeding Adolphe Pauli, with whom he had worked at the start of his career. As city architect of Ghent he carried out many works of restoration and renovation. Among other things, he extended the Cloth Hall, extended the Academy of Ghent, and turned two Gothic houses (the Zwarte Moor and the Grote Sikkel) into a conservatory. He built many buildings in Ghent, including twenty schools. Among the latter are the Andries School on Triestlaan (1881–1883) and the Laurentius Institute on Onderstraat (1901), both in Flemish Neo-Renaissance style.

His best known work, however, is the Museum of Fine Arts, built between 1898 and 1904 and extended in 1912.

Van Rysselberghe also taught architecture at the Ghent academy. In 1905 he was one of the founders of the Ghent Workers Housing Company. It was one of the first social housing associations in Belgium, and for it he completed five projects. Van Rysselberghe had limited resources for this work, but still managed a polychrome use of materials on a lively design.

Selected works 
 1880–1881: Intermediate section of Ghent City Hall, built along the Poeljemarkt between the Aldermen's House of Gedele and the Armenkamer
 1887–1888: City school on Kaprijkestraat in Ghent
 1891: Urban boy school on Drongensesteenweg in Ghent
 1891: City school on Désiré Van Monckhovenstraat in Ghent
 1893: City school on Molenaarsstraat in Ghent
 1898: Urban primary school for girls on Acaciastraat in Ghent
 1898–1904: Museum of Fine Arts of Ghent
 1901–02: Fire station on Londenstraat in Ghent
 1904: City school on Frans van Ryhovelaan/Lavendelstraat in Ghent
 1911–1912: Social housing on Bellefleurstraat in Ghent
 1912–1913: Social housing on Biezenstuk/Rooigemlaan in Ghent
 1914: Urban school for girls on Lammensstraat in Ghent

See also
 Van Rysselberghe family

References

Further reading
 D. Laporte, Architectuurgids Gent, Turnhout, 1994.
 Francis Strauven, "Van Rysselberghe, Charles", dans: Dictionnaire de l'architecture en Belgique, Anvers : Mercator, 2003, .

1850 births
1920 deaths
19th-century Belgian architects
20th-century Belgian architects
People from Hoogstraten